Beautiful Noise is an HD television music profile and performance series produced in Canada by Original Spin Media. The series premiered on Rave HD in the United States in the summer of 2006. The programs debuted in Canada on Sun TV in January 2008 and CBC Bold in March 2009. The series was filmed at Toronto's Berkeley Church performance and event venue.

Season 1
 Feist
 Cowboy Junkies
 Neko Case
 Jeff Healey
 Ron Sexsmith
 Sarah Harmer
 Kathleen Edwards
 North Mississippi Allstars
 The Stills
 Pilot Speed
 The Sisters Euclid (Kevin Breit)
 Sam Roberts Band

Season 2
 Ben Kweller
 Stars of Track and Field
 The Ponys
 Voxtrot
 Sloan
 The Long Winters
 Finger Eleven
 Apples in Stereo
 Grace Potter and the Nocturnals

Season 3

 My Morning Jacket
 Dr. Dog
 The Constantines
 Ted Leo & the Pharmacists
 The Black Angels
 The Donnas
 Islands
 Stars
 People in Planes
 British Sea Power
 Yo La Tengo
 Thriving Ivory
 Sarah Slean
 Joel Plaskett
 Jim White
 Kaki King
 Jon Langford
 Peter Elkas

External links
 From The Torontoist
 From Chromewaves
 From Chromewaves ii
 Media in Canada: "Sun TV unveils fall sked"
 Distribution by Cargo-Film
 RAVEHD
 Clips and Videos

2000s Canadian variety television series
2000s Canadian music television series
2007 Canadian television series debuts
Television shows filmed in Toronto